Hybolasius parvus is a species of beetle in the family Cerambycidae. It was described by Broun in 1880. It is known from New Zealand. It contains the varietas Hybolasius parvus var. pusillus.

References

Hybolasius
Beetles described in 1880